Cobitis brevifasciata is a species of loach endemic to the Korean Peninsula.

References

Cobitidae
Fish of Asia
Taxa named by Ik-Soo Kim
Fish described in 1995